The 1995 NSL First Division was the 11th edition of the NSL First Division. The competition was won by Cape Town Spurs.

References

1995